Leguminivora is a genus of moths belonging to the subfamily Olethreutinae of the family Tortricidae.

Species
Legumivora anthracotis (Meyrick, 1913)
Leguminivora glycinivorella (Matsumura, 1898) (China, India, Japan, Africa)
Legumivora ischnodes Razowski & Wojtusiak, 2012
Leguminivora longigula Komai & Horak, in Horak, 2006 (Australia)
Leguminivora meridiana Kuznetzov, 1992
Legumivora parastrepta (Meyrick, 1907)
Leguminivora ptychora (Meyrick, 1907)

See also
List of Tortricidae genera

References
Obraztsov N. S. 1960. Die Gattungen der Palaearktischen Tortricidae. II. Die Unterfamilie Olethreutinae. 3. Teil. - Tijdschrift voor Entomologie 103(1–2):111–143, pls 11–13: 129–131.

External links
tortricidae.com

Tortricidae genera
Olethreutinae